Robert Jameson (1774–1854) was a naturalist and mineralogist.

Robert Jameson may also refer to:

 Robert Jameson (shipowner) (d. 1608) Scottish merchant
 Bobby Jameson (1945–2015), American singer and songwriter
 Robert Sympson Jameson (1796–1854), Canadian lawyer, judge and political figure
 Robert William Jameson (1805–1868), politician, playwright and newspaper editor

See also
 Robert Jamieson (disambiguation)